The Humane King Sutra is found in Taisho No. 245 and 246. Many scholars have suspected this sutra to be composed in China but not all scholars agree with this viewpoint. There are two versions: the first is called the Humane King Perfection of Wisdom Sutra (仁王般若波羅蜜經), while the second is called the Humane King State-Protection Perfection of Wisdom Sutra (仁王護國般若波羅蜜經), more idiomatically the Prajnaparamita Scripture for Humane Kings Who Wish to Protect their States. Both sutras are found in the prajnaparamita section of the Taisho Tripitaka.

This sutra is unusual in the fact that its target audience, rather than being either lay practitioners or the community of monks and nuns, is the rulership (i.e. monarchs, presidents, prime ministers, etc.). Thus, for example, where the interlocutors in most scriptures are arhats or bodhisattvas, the discussants in this text are the kings of the sixteen ancient regions of India. The foregrounded teachings, rather than being meditation and wisdom, are "humaneness" and "forbearance" or "ksanti", these being the most applicable religious values for the governance of a Buddhist state. Hence today in some Chinese temples, the sutra is used during prayers on behalf of the government and the country.

A second translation from a Sanskrit text was carried out a few centuries after the appearance of the original version, by the monk Amoghavajra (Bukong 不空), one of the most important figures in the Chinese Esoteric tradition, as well as a patriarch in the Shingon school of Japan.  This second version of the text (仁王護國般若波羅蜜經, T 246.8.834-845) is similar to the original version (仁王般若波羅蜜經, T 245.8.825-834), the translation of which was attributed to Kumārajīva, but it contains new sections that include teachings on mandala, mantra, and dhāraṇī.

Themes 
One theme of the sutra is impermanence. This is famously quoted in the first line of The Tale of the Heike, whose latter half reads: .

Translations 
There are two classical Chinese translations extant:
the 仁王護國般若波羅蜜經 Renwang Huguo Bore Boluomi Jing (trans. by Kumārajīva in 410-412).
the 仁王護國般若波羅蜜多經 Renwang Huguo Bore Boluomiduo Jing (trans. by Amoghavajra in 765-766). Amogavajra translated the mantras.
The discovery of the Old Translated Inwanggyeong (구역인왕경;舊譯仁王經) in Gugyeol in the mid-1970s contributed to Middle Korean studies.

See Also 
 Japanese Imperial Rituals

Notes

References

Further reading 

 Conze, Edward  (1974). The Short Prajnaparamita Texts. [esp. The Sutra on Perfect Wisdom Which Explains How Benevolent Kings May Protect Their Countries] pp. 165-183. 
 Orzech, Charles D. (1989). Puns on the Humane King: Analogy and Application in an East Asian Apocryphon, Journal of the American Oriental Society 109 /1, 17-24
 Orzech, Charles D. Politics and Transcendent Wisdom: The Scripture for Humane Kings in the Creation of Chinese Buddhism. Pennsylvania State University Press, 2008. 
 Orzech, Charles D. (2002). Metaphor, Translation, and the Construction of Kingship in The Scripture for Humane Kings and the Mahāmāyūrī Vidyārājñī Sūtra, Cahiers d'Extrême-Asie 13, 55-83

External links 
Digital Dictionary of Buddhism (log in with userID "guest")

Vajrayana
Mahayana sutras
Religion and politics
Post-canonical Buddhist texts
Chinese Buddhist texts
Japanese Imperial Rituals